This is a list of prisons within Jilin province of the People's Republic of China.

Sources 

Buildings and structures in Jilin
Jilin